Gordonstown is a rural settlement in the Formartine area of Aberdeenshire, Scotland.

Geography
Gordonstown lies along the road from Badenscoth to Fyvie, near to its junction with the B9001 road at Badenscoth.

Education
The area is served by nearby primary schools at Auchterless and Rothienorman.

Wind farm
Gordonstown Wind Farm, consisting of five turbines, came into operation in March 2013.

References

External links 
 Gordonstown (Formartine) on Ordnance Survey GetOutside

Villages in Aberdeenshire